Faraday's laws of electrolysis are quantitative relationships based on the electrochemical research published by Michael Faraday in 1833.

First law

Michael Faraday reported that the mass of elements deposited at an electrode is directly proportional to the charge (SI units are ampere seconds or coulombs).

Here, the constant of proportionality, is called the electro-chemical equivalent (ECE) of the substance. Thus, the ECE can be defined as the mass of the substance deposited/liberated per unit charge.

Second law

Faraday discovered that when the same amount of electric current is passed through different electrolytes/elements connected in series, the mass of the substance liberated/deposited at the electrodes is directly proportional to their chemical equivalent/equivalent weight.  This turns out to be the molar mass divided by the valence

Derivation

A monovalent ion requires 1 electron for discharge, a divalent ion requires 2 electrons for discharge and so on. Thus, if  electrons flow,  atoms are discharged. 

So the mass  discharged is

where 
 is the Avogadro constant;
 is the total charge, equal to the number of electrons times the elementary charge ;
 is the Faraday constant.

Mathematical form

Faraday's laws can be summarized by

In the simple case of constant-current electrolysis, leading to

and then to

where:
  is the amount of substance ("number of moles") liberated: 
  is the total time the constant current was applied.

For the case of an alloy whose constituents have different valencies, we have

where  represents the mass fraction of the -th element.

In the more complicated case of a variable electric current, the total charge  is the electric current  integrated over time :

Here  is the total electrolysis time.

See also
 Electrolysis
 Faraday's law of induction
 Tafel equation

References

Further reading
 Serway, Moses, and Moyer, Modern Physics, third edition (2005), principles of physics.
 Experiment with Faraday's laws 

Electrochemistry
Electrolysis
Electrochemical equations
Scientific laws